Alfred Thomas Lyons (5 July 1885 – October 1938) was an English footballer and cricketer. He played as a wicket-keeper for Staffordshire in the 1913 Minor Counties Cricket Championship.

He played for Aston Villa from 1907 to 1915, and then joined Port Vale in January 1917. Five years later he moved on to Walsall as a player-coach. He helped Villa to win the First Division in 1909–10 and the FA Cup in 1913. They also finished second in the league in 1907–08, 1910–11, 1912–13, and 1913–14, and was also on the losing side in the 1910 FA Charity Shield.

Career
Lyons played for Hednesford Town and Bridgtown Amateurs, before joining Aston Villa as a professional in April 1907 after a trial three months earlier. The "Villans" ended the 1907–08 campaign in second place in the First Division, nine points behind champions Manchester United. They dropped to seventh spot in 1908–09, before being crowned champions of the Football League in 1909–10. He played at Stamford Bridge in the 1910 FA Charity Shield, which ended in a 1–0 defeat to Brighton & Hove Albion. Villa went on to finish the 1910–11 season in second place, just one point behind Manchester United. They then dropped to sixth in 1911–12, before finishing second in 1912–13 just four points behind champions Sunderland. He played against Sunderland in the 1913 FA Cup Final at Crystal Palace, which ended in a 1–0 victory for Villa. They then finished second in the league once again in 1913–14, finishing seven points behind champions Blackburn Rovers. Villa dropped to 14th place in 1914–15, and league football was suspended due to World War I. In his eight years at Villa Park, Lyons played 238 competitive games.

Lyons joined Port Vale, initially on guest terms, in January 1917.  He was a member of the side that lifted the Staffordshire Senior Cup and shared the North Staffordshire Infirmary Cup in 1920. He played 32 Second Division games in the 1919–20 season, and played 32 league and FA Cup games in the 1920–21 campaign. He was released from The Old Recreation Ground in the summer. He had played a total of 146 first team games and scored three goals for the club. Lyons later played for Walsall in a player-coach capacity.

Career statistics
Source:

Honours
Aston Villa
Football League First Division: 1909–10
FA Charity Shield runner-up: 1910
FA Cup: 1913

Port Vale
Staffordshire Senior Cup: 1920
North Staffordshire Infirmary Cup: 1920

References

1885 births
1938 deaths
People from Hednesford
English footballers
Association football fullbacks
Hednesford Town F.C. players
Aston Villa F.C. players
Port Vale F.C. players
Walsall F.C. players
English Football League players
FA Cup Final players
Association football coaches
English cricketers
Staffordshire cricketers
Wicket-keepers